(A/The) World of Music may refer to:

Film, TV and radio
World of Music (TV series), a 1968 CBC classical music series
A World of Music (TV series), a 1966 Canadian musical television series
The World of Music, a Canadian variety television series on CBC Television from 1960 to 1961
"A World of Music", a 1992 episode of Barney & Friends

Music
World of Music, magazine edited by Isaac B. Woodbury
World of Music (Zeebra album)
World of Music (Mary O'Hara album), 1989
A World of Music, compilation album A. R. Rahman

Other
The World of Music (journal), an academic journal published by the Department of Musicology at the University of Göttingen

See also
Wide World of Music, retail chain run by ABC Retail Records, unit of American Broadcasting Companies
World of Music, Arts and Dance (WOMAD)
World Music (disambiguation)